

Champions

Major League Baseball
World Series: New York Yankees over Chicago Cubs (4–0)
All-Star Game, July 6 at Crosley Field: National League, 4-1

Other champions
Amateur World Series: Great Britain
Negro League Baseball All-Star Game: West, 5-4
Central American and Caribbean Games: Cuba

Awards and honors
Baseball Hall of Fame
Grover Cleveland Alexander
Alexander Cartwright
Henry Chadwick
Most Valuable Player
Jimmie Foxx, Boston Red Sox, 1B (AL)
Ernie Lombardi, Cincinnati Reds, C (NL)
The Sporting News Player of the Year Award
Johnny Vander Meer, Cincinnati Reds, P
The Sporting News Manager of the Year Award
Joe McCarthy, New York Yankees

MLB statistical leaders

Major league baseball final standings

American League final standings

National League final standings

Negro league baseball final standings

Negro American League final standings

Memphis won the first half; Atlanta won the second half.
Memphis beat Atlanta 2 games to 0 games in a contested play-off that was declared "no contest" after 2 games.

Negro National League final standings

Events

January–May
February 10 – The St. Louis Browns trade Rollie Hemsley to the Cleveland Indians for Ed Cole, Roy Hughes and Billy Sullivan.
March 6 – The Philadelphia Phillies trade Dolph Camilli to the Brooklyn Dodgers for Eddie Morgan and $45,000.
April 3 – Goose Goslin joins the Washington Senators.
April 16 – The St. Louis Cardinals trade Dizzy Dean to the Chicago Cubs for Curt Davis, Clyde Shoun, Tuck Stainback and $185,000.
April 18 – The Boston Red Sox defeat the New York Yankees in the season opener at Fenway Park. Hall of famer Joe Gordon makes his major league debut at second base for the Yankees.
April 19
Heinie Mueller of the Philadelphia Phillies and Ernie Koy of the Brooklyn Dodgers each hit a home run in their first Major League Baseball at-bats, as Brooklyn defeats Philadelphia, 12–5, at the Baker Bowl.
Enos Slaughter goes three-for-five in his major league debut with a double and a strike out.
Fritz Ostermueller holds the New York Yankees to just two hits, as the Boston Red Sox shutout the Yanks, 6-0.
April 24 – Dizzy Dean holds his former team to just four hits, as the Cubs beat the Cardinals, 4-0.
May 5 – The Chicago Cubs defeat the Philadelphia Phillies 21-2 at Wrigley Field.
May 6 – At International League, Newark Bears outfielder Bob Seeds hits four home runs in four successive innings and drives in 12 runs against the Buffalo Bisons. The next day, Seeds slams three more. His seven homers in the two-day barrage account for 17 runs batted in and 30 total bases. In his first 59 games‚ Seeds will clout 28 HR with 95 RBI.
May 14 – The Philadelphia Athletics acquire Dick Siebert from the St. Louis Cardinals in exchange for Paul Easterling, Gene Hasson and George Turbeville.

June–July
June 5 – The Chicago White Sox win the first game of a double header with the Philadelphia Athletics, 8-2, to snap a ten-game losing streak.
June 6 – The Cincinnati Reds sent Alex Kampouris to the New York Giants in exchange for Wally Berger.
June 11 – Cincinnati Reds pitcher Johnny Vander Meer tosses a no-hitter against the Boston Bees, leading his team to a 3–0 win.
June 13 – The Philadelphia Phillies sent Bucky Walters to the Cincinnati Reds in exchange for Spud Davis, Al Hollingsworth and $50,000.
June 15 – Johnny Vander Meer becomes the first, and only to date, pitcher in Major League history to threw two consecutive no-hitters as the Cincinnati Reds blank the Brooklyn Dodgers, 6–0.
June 18
Babe Ruth signs a contract to coach with the Brooklyn Dodgers. Ruth dons a Dodger uniform the next day, entertains observers with a batting demonstration, and works the third-base coaching box for the remainder of the season.
Lefty Mills of the St. Louis Browns pitches a 1–0 shutout over the New York Yankees. It is the second of only two shut outs the Yankees endure all season.
June 26 – Carl Hubbell wins his 200th career game‚ as the New York Giants beat the visiting Chicago Cubs, 5–1, and stretch their National League lead over the second-place Cincinnati Reds to two games. Larry French takes the loss, while newly acquired Bob Seeds‚ up from Newark‚ leads the way with a 470-foot inside-the-park home run.
July 6 – At Crosley Field, home of the Cincinnati Reds, the National League defeats the American League, 4–1, in the All-Star Game.
July 12 – The Pittsburgh Pirates complete a thirteen-game winning streak to pull themselves within half a game of the first place  New York Giants.
July 16 – The St. Louis Browns snap a ten-game losing streak with an 8–3 victory over the Boston Red Sox.
July 29 - Jake Powell is interviewed by WGN's Bob Elson. When asked about his work as a police office in Dayton Ohio, Powell brags that he "beats n*****s in the head". Commissioner Landis suspends Powell for the comments.

August–September
August 2 – The Brooklyn Dodgers and the St. Louis Cardinals used a yellow baseball in the first game of a doubleheader as an experiment. The two teams went back to the white ball in the second game as the Dodgers swept the doubleheader 6–2 and 9–3.
August 7 – Mickey Cochrane is replaced as manager of the Detroit Tigers by Del Baker.
August 9 – The Philadelphia A's send Bill Nicholson and $30,000 to the Washington Senators for Dee Miles.
August 10 – The New York Yankees trade Eddie Miller to the Boston Bees for Gil English, Johnny Riddle, cash and four players to be named later. On February 4, the Yankees receive Joe DiMaggio's brother, Vince to complete the trade.
August 20 – Cleveland Indians catchers Hank Helf and Frank Pytlak break the "all-time altitude mark" by catching baseballs dropped from the 708-foot Cleveland Terminal Tower.
August 22 – Preacher Roe makes his major league debut for the St. Louis Cardinals. He lasts just 2.2 innings and gives up four earned runs. He doesn't pitch in the major leagues again until  with the Pittsburgh Pirates.
August 27 – In the second game of a doubleheader, Monte Pearson pitches a no-hitter as the New York Yankees crush the Cleveland Indians, 13–0.
September 9
Lou Boudreau makes his major league debut for the Cleveland Indians in an 11–5 loss to the Detroit Tigers.
The Cincinnati Reds sell Jake Mooty and Jimmy Outlaw to the Brooklyn Dodgers. Five days later (September 14), Commissioner Landis voids the deal, making both players eligible for the draft. Outlaw is drafted by the St. Louis Cardinals in the 1938 rule 5 draft on October 5, and traded to the Dodgers for Lew Krausse and cash on December 13. Brooklyn then packages him with Buddy Hassett, and send him to the Boston Bees for Ira Hutchinson and Gene Moore the same day. Mooty isn't drafted until October 3, 1939, by the Chicago Cubs from Syracuse (International).
September 10 – At the Polo Grounds, the New York Giants defeat the Brooklyn Dodgers, 20-2.
September 30 – The Chicago Cubs and St. Louis Cardinals play to a 7–7 tie. The tie breaks the Cubs' ten-game winning streak that sees them go from 3.5 games back of the Pittsburgh Pirates to first place in the National League.

October–December
October 5 – Red Ruffing and the New York Yankees take game one of the 1938 World Series, 3-1, over the Chicago Cubs at Wrigley Field.
October 6 – The Cubs jump out to a 1–0, then 3–2 lead against the Yankees, however, two run home runs by Frankie Crosetti and Joe DiMaggio in the eighth and ninth inning, respectively, give the Yankees the 6–3 victory.
October 8 – With two outs and no one on base, a two out rally in the fifth inning plates two runs, as the New York Yankees take game three of the World Series, 5-2.
October 9 – The New York Yankees defeat the Chicago Cubs, 8–3, in Game four of the World Series to win a record third consecutive World Championship, and seventh overall, four games to none.
November 1 – National League batting champ Ernie Lombardi of the Cincinnati Reds is named the Most Valuable Player. Chicago Cubs pitcher Bill Lee is the runner-up.
November 2 – Boston Red Sox first baseman Jimmie Foxx is voted Most Valuable Player of the American League for the third time, with New York Yankees catcher Bill Dickey second in the voting.
November 28 – The Chicago White Sox 25-year-old pitching star Monty Stratton has his right leg amputated as a result of a hunting accident. Stratton attempted comeback is chronicled in The Stratton Story, with James Stewart in the title role.
December 6 – The Chicago Cubs trade Frank Demaree, Billy Jurges and Ken O'Dea to the New York Giants for Dick Bartell, Hank Leiber and Gus Mancuso.
December 14 – Major League Baseball teams adopt several resolutions. The National League allows the Cincinnati Reds to play their season opener one day before other teams, as a way of honoring the 100th anniversary of baseball and of the 1869 Red Stockings being the first professional team. In other news, Will Harridge is re-elected as American League president and given a 10-year term. The AL permits the Cleveland Indians and Philadelphia Athletics to play night games. Finally, MLB agree on a standard ball but disagree on increasing rosters from 23 to 25 players. Judge Landis will eventually decide on 25.
December 15 – The Boston Red Sox trade Ben Chapman to the Cleveland Indians for Denny Galehouse and Tommy Irwin, trade Pinky Higgins and Archie McKain to the Detroit Tigers for Elden Auker, Chet Morgan and Jake Wade, and sell Bill Harris' contract to the New York Giants.
December 16 – The Boston Bees trade Ray Mueller to the Pittsburgh Pirates for Johnny Dickshot and Al Todd.

Births

January
January 7 – Fred Whitfield
January 10 – Willie McCovey
January 16 – Ron Herbel
January 18 – Curt Flood
January 23 – Bob Moorhead

February
February 2 – Max Alvis
February 7 – Johnny Werhas
February 13 – Dick Hughes
February 15 – Chuck Estrada
February 18 – Manny Mota
February 19 – Bob Sadowski
February 22 – Steve Barber

March
March 3 – Tetsuya Yoneda
March 5 – Larry Elliot
March 7 – Jimmie Hall
March 15 – Bob Locker
March 16 – Cal Browning
March 23 – Sam Bowens
March 25 – Alan Koch
March 30 – Dave Baldwin
March 31 – John Herrnstein
March 31 – Moose Stubing

April
April 2 – Al Weis
April 4 – A. Bartlett Giamatti
April 5 – Ron Hansen
April 5 – Don Prince
April 8 – Tom Butters
April 11 – Art Quirk
April 16 – Rich Rollins
April 18 – Rogelio Álvarez
April 20 – Jim Dickson
April 22 – John Orsino

May
May 3 – Chris Cannizzaro
May 4 – Howie Koplitz
May 10 – Merritt Ranew
May 12 – Norm Gigon
May 15 – Al McBean
May 27 – Fred Bruckbauer
May 29 – Fay Vincent
May 29 – Dale Willis
May 31 – Ray Washburn

June
June 2 – Lee Gregory
June 2 – Gene Michael
June 4 – Art Mahaffey
June 10 – Johnny Edwards
June 15 – Billy Williams
June 19 – Bob Aspromonte
June 24 – Don Mincher
June 27 – Elmo Plaskett
June 28 – Orlando McFarlane

July
July 1 – Craig Anderson
July 2 – Don Choate
July 2 – Hal Reniff
July 6 – John Boozer
July 6 – Barry Shetrone
July 7 – Bob Lipski
July 8 – Bill Spanswick
July 10 – Mike Brumley
July 11 – Ted Schreiber
July 12 – Ron Fairly
July 13 – Don Pavletich
July 16 – Bob Burda
July 17 – Deron Johnson
July 19 – Gordie Richardson
July 20 – Tony Oliva
July 27 – Harry Wendelstedt
July 29 – Don Wert

August
August 4 – Ray Oyler
August 11 – Vada Pinson
August 16 – Buck Rodgers
August 17 – Dick Lines
August 27 – Joe McCabe
August 28 – Billy Cowan
August 28 – Dick LeMay

September
September 1 – Merlin Nippert
September 8 – George Werley
September 9 – Jay Ward
September 13 – Bob Heffner
September 14 – Frank Carpin
September 15 – Gaylord Perry
September 17 – Bobby Wine
September 20 – Tom Tresh
September 24 – George Banks
September 27 – Alex George
September 29 – Mike McCormick

October
October 2 – Mike de la Hoz
October 3 – Patricia Roy
October 11 – Bill Roman
October 13 – Ron Moeller
October 18 – Bobby Knoop
October 19 – Vic Roznovsky
October 31 – Jim Donohue

November
November 5 – Ed Olivares
November 6 – Mack Jones
November 7 – Jake Gibbs
November 7 – Jim Kaat
November 14 – Johnnie Seale
November 17 – Aubrey Gatewood
November 18 – Bud Zipfel
November 19 – Manny Jiménez
November 19 – Ted Turner
November 20 – Herm Starrette
November 27 – Vern Handrahan
November 27 – José Tartabull

December
December 4 – Billy Bryan
December 5 – Al Moran
December 5 – Chico Ruiz
December 6 – Amado Samuel
December 14 – Ken Hunt
December 17 – Leo Cárdenas
December 18 – Mike White
December 22 – Matty Alou
December 24 – Bobby Henrich
December 25 – Jack Hamilton

Deaths

January
January   1 – Frank Sexton, 65, pitcher for the 1895 Boston Beaneaters of the National League.
January 12 – Dupee Shaw, 78, pitcher who played six seasons.  Won 30 games and struck out 451 batters in 1884.
January 16 – Earl Clark, 30, backup outfielder who hit .291 in 293 games for the Boston Braves and St. Louis Browns from 1927 to 1934.
January 16 – Joe Sommer, 79, infielder/outfielder between 1880 and 1890, most prominently for the Baltimore Orioles of the American Association.
January 19 – Bill Everitt, 69, infielder who played from 1895 through 1901 for the Chicago Colts/Orphans and the Washington Senators.
January 20 – Herb Goodall, 67, pitcher for the 1890 Louisville Colonels of the American Association.
January 27 – Larry Battam, 61, third baseman for the 1895 New York Giants of the National League.
January 24 – Jim Mutrie, 86, manager who led New York Metropolitans to the American Association title in 1884, then won pennants in 1888–89 after moving to NY's NL franchise – which he renamed by marveling over his "Giants"; career .611 winning percentage was best of 19th century.
January 28 – Bill Hill, 63, pitcher who played from 1896 to 1899 for five different National League clubs.
January 28 – Pop Rising, 56, outfielder for the 1905 Boston Americans.
January 31 – Charlie Chech, 59, pitcher for the Cincinnati Reds, Cleveland Naps and Boston Red Sox between 1905 and 1909.
January 31 – Jim Gray, 75, infielder who played for the Pittsburgh Alleghenys/Burghers/Pirates between 1884 and 1893.

February
February   3 – Mike Donovan, 56, third baseman for the Cleveland Naps in 1904 and the New York Highlanders in 1908.
February   9 – Charlie Daniels, 76, pitcher for the 1884 Boston Reds of the Union Association.
February 16 – Lee Tannehill, 57, infielder for the Chicago White Sox from 1903 to 1912, who is credited as the first player to hit a home run in the original Comiskey Park.
February 21 – George Merritt, 57, outfielder who played from 1903 through 1905 for the Pittsburgh Pirates.
February 22 – Mert Hackett, 78, catcher for five seasons, including the 1883 National League champions, the Boston Beaneaters.
February 26 – Tex Jones, 53, played nine games for the Chicago White Sox in 1911.

March
March   2 – Walter Prince, 76, first baseman who played from 1883 to 1884 for the Louisville Eclipse, Detroit Wolverines and Washington Nationals.
March   4 – Jack Taylor, 64, pitcher for the Chicago Orphans/Cubs and St. Louis Cardinals from 1898 to 1907, who won twenty or more games in four seasons, hurled 187 consecutive complete games between 1901 and 1906, and was a member of the world champion 1907 Cubs.
March   6 – Rube Lutzke, 40, third baseman for the Cleveland Indians from 1923 to 1927, who led the American League in putouts and assists in the 1923 season.
March   7 – Stephen McKeever, 84, co-owner of the Brooklyn Dodgers since 1912 and club president since 1932.
March 13 – Rube Ellis, 52, left fielder who hit .260 in 555 games for the St. Louis Cardinals from 1909 to 1912.
March 18 – Hobe Ferris, 60, lowest ever career on-base percentage; committed first ever error in a World Series game.
March 18 – Milo Netzel, 51, third baseman/left fielder for the 1909 Cleveland Naps of the American League.
March 20 – Bob Fothergill, 40, left fielder for the Tigers, White Sox and Red Sox from 1922 to 1933, whose .325 career average ranks him for 41st place on the Major League all-time list.
March 24 – Joe Dolan, 65, backup infielder for the Colonels, Phillies and Athletics between the 1896 and 1901 seasons.
March 25 – Al Burris, 64, pitcher for the 1894 Philadelphia Phillies.
March 29 – Tillinghast L'Hommedieu Huston, 70, civil engineer and businessman who was the co-owner, with Jacob Ruppert, of the New York Yankees from 1915 to 1923.
March 30 – Dasher Troy, 81, second baseman for five seasons, most notably for the 1884 American Association champs, the New York Metropolitans.

April
April   3 – Charlie Brown, 66, pitcher for the 1897 Cleveland Spiders of the National League.
April   6 – J. B. Young, 80, pitcher who appeared in one game with the 1892 St. Louis Browns of the National League.
April 11 – Cristóbal Torriente, 44, All-Star Cuban right fielder in the Negro leagues who batted .339 lifetime.
April 17 – Alex Beam, 68, pitcher for the 1889 Pittsburgh Alleghenys of the National League.
April 20 – Tim O'Rourke, 73, backup infielder who played from 1890 through 1894 for the Syracuse Stars, Columbus Solons, Baltimore Orioles, Louisville Colonels and St. Louis Browns.
April 30 – Sun Daly, 73, outfielder for the 1892 Baltimore Orioles, who earned his nickname because he never wore sun glasses.

May
May 11 – Buzz Murphy, 43, outfielder who played from 1918 to 1919 with the Boston Braves and the Washington Senators.
May 21 – Sam Childs, 76, first baseman for the 1883 Columbus Buckeyes of the American Association.
May 21 – Silver King, 70, pitcher who had three 30-win seasons for the 1887–89 St. Louis Browns and another for the 1890 Chicago team in the Players' League, who is regarded as the first sidearm pitcher.
May 22 – Harry Lumley, 57,  right fielder and manager who spent his entire career with the Brooklyn Superbas in the National League from 1904 to 1910, while leading the league with 18 triples and nine home runs during his rookie season.

June
June 12 – Josh Reilly, 70, second baseman for the 1896 Chicago Colts of the National League, who later managed in the minor leagues.
June 12 – Buck Thrasher, 48, right fielder who hit .255 in 30 games with the Philadelphia Athletics from 1916 to 1917.
June 20 – Pat Newnam, 57, first baseman who played from 1910 to 1911 for the St. Louis Browns of the American League.
June 25 – Bumpus Jones, 68, pitcher for the Cincinnati Reds and New York Giants from 1892 to 1893, who hurled a no-hitter against the Pittsburgh Pirates in the 1892 season.
June 27 – Jerry Donovan, 61, backup catcher for the 1906 Philadelphia Phillies.

July
July   4 – Chief Roseman, 82, outfielder for six different teams between 1882 and 1890, who also managed the St. Louis Browns in his last major league season.
July   9 – George Dickerson, 46, pitcher for the Cleveland Indians in the 1917 season.
July 21 – Carl Spongberg, 54, pitcher for the 1908 Chicago Cubs.
July 27 – Milt Reed, 48, shortstop/second baseman who played between 1911 and 1914 with the Cardinals and Phillies, and for the Brooklyn Tip-Tops of the Federal League in 1915.
July 31 – Bill Carney, 64, right fielder who played briefly for the Chicago Cubs in the 1904 season.
July 31 – Doc Miller, 55, Canadian outfielder who posted a .295 average from 1910 through 1914 for the Chicago Cubs, Boston Doves/Rustlers/Braves, Philadelphia Phillies and Cincinnati Reds, while leading the National League with 192 hits in the 1912 season.

August
August   1 – Al Munro Elias, 67, who along with his brother Walter founded in 1913 the Elias Sports Bureau, official statistician of the National League.
August   1 – Tug Thompson, 81, Canadian outfielder/catcher for the 1882 Cincinnati Red Stockings and the 1884 Indianapolis Hoosiers, and a member of the 1882 American Association Champion team.
August   2 – Jim Curry, 52, second baseman who played in part of three seasons for the Philadelphia Athletics, New York Highlanders and Detroit Tigers.
August 11 – Cliff Hill, 45, pitcher for the Philadelphia Athletics during the 1917 season.
August 30 – Gene Moore, 52, pitcher who posted a 2-2 record and a 4.76 ERA for the  Pittsburgh Pirates and Cincinnati Reds between 1909 and 1912.

September
September   7 – Lee King, 44, outfielder for the Philadelphia Athletics (1916) and the Boston Braves (1919).
September 19 – Pink Hawley, 72, pitcher who posted a 167-179 record and a 3.96 ERA in 393 games with the Browns, Pirates, Reds, Giants and Brewers from 1892 to 1901.
September 27 – Cy Ferry, 60, pitcher who played from 1904 to 1905 for the Detroit Tigers and Cleveland Naps of the American League.
September 28 – Bill Rollinson, 82, catcher for the 1884 Washington Nationals of the Union Association.

October
October   3 – Morgan Murphy, 71, catcher and noted sign stealer for 11 seasons, from 1890 to 1901.
October   4 – Fred Doe, 74, pitcher who played for the Pittsburgh Burghers and the Buffalo Bisons of the  Players' League during the 1890 season.
October 16 – Joe Knight, 79, Canadian-born outfielder who finished sixth in the 1890 National League batting race with a .312 average.
October 24 – George Borchers, 69, pitcher for the Chicago White Stockings (1888) and the Louisville Colonels (1895).
October 29 – Tom Daly, 72, catcher/second baseman for five teams of three different leagues, who posted a .278 average in 1568 career games played between 1884 and 1903.
October 29 – Babe Towne, 58, backup catcher for the 1906 Chicago White Sox.

November
November   1 –  Charles Weeghman, 64, owner of the Chicago Whales of the "outlaw" Federal League (1914–1915) and Chicago Cubs (1916–1919); builder of what would become Wrigley Field.
November   3 –  Milt Scott, 77, first baseman who played between 1882 and 1886 for the Chicago White Stockings, Detroit Wolverines, Pittsburgh Alleghenys and Baltimore Orioles.
November 10 – Chet Spencer, 55, outfielder for the 1906 Boston Beaneaters of the National League.
November 11 – Fred Hartman, 70, third baseman who posted a .278 average and 333 RBI between 1894 and 1902 for the Pirates, Browns, Giants, White Sox and Cardinals.
November 12 – Andy Harrington, 49, pitcher who played for the Cincinnati Reds in the 1913 season.
November 14 – Les Nunamaker, 49, catcher for the Red Sox, Yankees, Browns and Indians from 1911 to 1922, who in 1914 threw out three baserunners attempting to steal in the same inning, to become the only 20th-century catcher to accomplish this feat at major league level.
November 21 – Polly Wolfe, 50, backup outfielder who played in 1912 and 1914 for the Chicago White Sox.

December
December   3 – Guy Hecker, 82, American Association pitcher/first baseman who won the Triple Crown as a pitcher in 1884 and a batting title in 1886 while hurling a no-hitter in 1882; one of two pitchers to hit three home runs in a single game (along Jim Tobin) and the only pitcher in Major League Baseball history to collect six hits in a nine-inning game.
December   7 – Tom Kearns, 79, second baseman/catcher who played between 1880 and 1884 for the  Buffalo Bisons and Detroit Wolverines.
December 19 – Art Griggs, 54, first baseman/outfielder for the Browns, Naps, Tip-Tops and Tigers between the 1909 and 1918 seasons.
December 24 – Luke Lutenberg, 74, first baseman for the 1894 Louisville Colonels.
December 24 – Bill Yohe, 60, first baseman who played for the Washington Senators of the American League during the 1909 season.